The Jubilee Medal "Thirty Years of Victory in the Great Patriotic War 1941–1945" was a state commemorative medal of the Soviet Union established on April 25, 1975 by decree of the Presidium of the Supreme Soviet of the USSR to denote the thirtieth anniversary of the Soviet victory over Nazi Germany in World War II.

Medal Statute 
The Jubilee Medal "Thirty Years of Victory in the Great Patriotic War 1941–1945" was awarded to: all military and civilian personnel of the Armed Forces of the USSR who took part in the Great Patriotic War of 1941 – 1945, to partisans of the Great Patriotic War, to the personnel of the Armed Forces of the USSR, as well as any other persons who were awarded the Medal "For the Victory over Germany in the Great Patriotic War 1941–1945", the Medal "For the Victory over Japan" or the Medal "For Valiant Labour in the Great Patriotic War 1941-1945".

The medal was awarded on behalf of the Presidium of the Supreme Soviet of the USSR by commanders of military units, formations, the heads of agencies, institutions; by republican, territorial, regional, district or municipal military commissariats, the Supreme Council of the Union and autonomous republics, the executive committees of regional, provincial, county, district and municipal Soviets.  Each medal came with an attestation of award, this attestation came in the form of a small 8 cm by 11 cm cardboard booklet bearing the award's name, the recipient's particulars and an official stamp and signature on the inside.

The Jubilee Medal "Thirty Years of Victory in the Great Patriotic War 1941–1945" was worn on the left side of the chest and in the presence of other orders and medals of the USSR, was located immediately following the Jubilee Medal "Twenty Years of Victory in the Great Patriotic War 1941-1945".  If worn in the presence of orders and medals of the Russian Federation, the latter have precedence.

Medal Description 

The Jubilee Medal "Thirty Years of Victory in the Great Patriotic War 1941–1945" was a 36mm in diameter circular brass medal.  On the obverse, over a background of fireworks in honour of the Soviet people's victory in World War 2, the relief image of Yevgeny Vuchetich's statue "The Motherland Calls", to the left of the statue, over descending and ascending laurel branches, a five pointed star and the dates "1945–1975".  On the reverse along the upper medal circumference the relief inscription "WAR PARTICIPANT" or "PARTICIPANT ON THE LABOUR FRONT", in the center, the relief inscription on seven lines "XXX  Years of Victory in the Great Patriotic War of 1941–1945".  At the bottom, the relief image of the hammer and sickle over a Ribbon of St George. On the medals struck to honour foreign nationals, the reverse inscriptions "WAR PARTICIPANT" or "PARTICIPANT ON THE LABOUR FRONT" were omitted. Ones with no inscriptions would be awarded to foreign leaders.

The medal was secured to a standard Soviet pentagonal mount by a ring through the medal suspension loop. The mount was covered by a 24mm wide red silk moiré ribbon with 1mm orange edge stripes.  On the left side, against the edge stripe, a 3mm black stripe with a 3mm orange stripe.  On the right, 3mm from the edge stripe, a 3mm green stripe.

Recipients (partial list) 

The individuals below were all recipients of the Jubilee Medal "Thirty Years of Victory in the Great Patriotic War 1941–1945".

Soviet recipients 
 Sniper captain Vasily Zaytsev
 Marshal of the Soviet Union and Defence Minister Dmitriy Ustinov
 World War 2 fighter pilot and later Marshal of Aviation Alexander Pokryshkin
 Marshal of the Soviet Union Andrei Grechko
 World War 2 naval veteran and Polar explorer Alexey Tryoshnikov
 Admiral of the Fleet Vladimir Kuroyedov
 Hero of Stalingrad and Colonel General Alexander Rodimtsev
 Lieutenant commander Michael Tsiselsky
 Army General Union Sergei Shtemenko
 Army General Semion Ivanov
 Physicist Alexander Mikhaylovich Prokhorov
 Composer and pianist Tikhon Nikolayevich Khrennikov
 Marshal of the Soviet Union Vasily Ivanovich Chuikov
 Marshal of the Soviet Union Aleksandr Mikhaylovich Vasilevsky
 Major General Vladimir Sergeyevich Ilyushin
 Marshal of the Soviet Union Ivan Ignatyevich Yakubovsky
 Author, Captain Vasil Uładzimiravič Bykaŭ
 Engineer, designer of rocket engines Valentin Petrovich Glushko
 Marshal of the Soviet Union Petr Kirillovich Koshevoi

Foreign recipients 
 Cuban revolutionary and politician Fidel Castro (Cuba)
 General and later President Wojciech Jaruzelski (Poland)
 General Michał Rola-Żymierski (Poland)

See also 
Great Patriotic War
Orders, decorations, and medals of the Soviet Union
Badges and Decorations of the Soviet Union

References

External links 
 Legal Library of the Soviet Union

Military awards and decorations of the Soviet Union
1975 establishments in the Soviet Union
Civil awards and decorations of the Soviet Union
Awards established in 1975